Lidanserin (INN; ZK-33,839) is a drug which acts as a combined 5-HT2A and α1-adrenergic receptor antagonist. It was developed as an antihypertensive agent but was never marketed.

See also 
 Glemanserin
 Pruvanserin
 Roluperidone
 Volinanserin
 Lenperone
 Iloperidone
 Ketanserin

References 

5-HT2A antagonists
Abandoned drugs
Alpha-1 blockers
Antihypertensive agents
Ketones
Fluoroarenes
Piperidines
Pyrrolidones